Aureonarius controversus is a species of fungus in the family Cortinariaceae.

Taxonomy 
It was first described in 2008 by the mycologist Bruno Gasparini who classified it as Cortinarius controversus.

In 2022 the species was transferred from Cortinarius and reclassified as Aureonarius controversus based on genomic data.

Habitat and distribution 
It is native to Tasmania.

References

External links

controversus
Fungi native to Australia
Fungi described in 2008